Abner Lewis (August 17, 1801 – October 12, 1879) was a U.S. Representative, judge and attorney from Jamestown, New York and Winona, Minnesota.

Biography
Lewis was born in Wells, Vermont on August 17, 1801. He was raised in Chautauqua County, New York, studied law with Abner Hazeltine in Jamestown, was admitted to the bar, and commenced practice in Panama.

He was a member of the New York State Assembly (Chautauqua Co.) in 1838 and 1839.

Lewis was elected as a Whig to the 29th United States Congress, holding office from March 4, 1845, to March 3, 1847. He did not run for reelection, and served as Chautauqua County Judge from June 1847 to November 1852.

In 1856 Lewis moved to Winona, Minnesota, where he practiced law and was active in several businesses, including the city's transit railroad. Lewis was also involved in several civic causes, including construction of the State Normal School, Minnesota's academy for training teachers.

During the American Civil War Lewis was a Voting Commissioner, responsible for enabling Union soldiers from western states to cast ballots while in the field. In 1867 he was appointed U.S. Internal Revenue Assessor for the district that included Winona.

Active in the Methodist church as a lay preacher, and a prominent member of the prohibition movement, in 1870 he was the Prohibition Party's nominee for governor.

Lewis was also interested in higher education, including serving as a Trustee of Hamline University and the State Normal School (now Winona State University), Minnesota's academy for training schoolteachers.

He remained active until his health began to fail in the late 1870s, after which he lived in retirement in Winona.

Lewis died in Winona on October 12, 1879. He was interred in Winona's Woodlawn Cemetery.

Sources

Minnesota Legal History Project, Biography, Abner Lewis, 2012

1801 births
1879 deaths
People from Harmony, New York
People from Winona, Minnesota
Republican Party members of the New York State Assembly
New York (state) state court judges
Minnesota Prohibitionists

Methodists from New York (state)
Whig Party members of the United States House of Representatives from New York (state)
19th-century American politicians
Activists from Vermont
Activists from New York (state)
People from Wells, Vermont
Activists from Minnesota
19th-century American judges
Methodists from Minnesota
19th-century American Methodist ministers